Jericho is a town in Crittenden County, Arkansas, United States. The population was 119 at the 2010 census, down from 184 in 2000.

Geography

Demographics

As of the census of 2000, there were 184 people, 66 households, and 46 families residing in the town.  The population density was 151.2/km2 (394.6/mi2).  There were 73 housing units at an average density of 60.0/km2 (156.5/mi2).  The racial makeup of the town was 4.35% White, 92.93% Black or African American, 0.54% from other races, and 2.17% from two or more races.  2.72% of the population were Hispanic or Latino of any race.

There were 66 households, out of which 19.7% had children under the age of 18 living with them, 40.9% were married couples living together, 27.3% had a female householder with no husband present, and 30.3% were non-families. 27.3% of all households were made up of individuals, and 13.6% had someone living alone who was 65 years of age or older.  The average household size was 2.79 and the average family size was 3.50.

In the town, the population was spread out, with 25.5% under the age of 18, 6.5% from 18 to 24, 25.5% from 25 to 44, 23.4% from 45 to 64, and 19.0% who were 65 years of age or older.  The median age was 40 years. For every 100 females, there were 75.2 males.  For every 100 females age 18 and over, there were 77.9 males.

The median income for a household in the town was $20,625, and the median income for a family was $28,214. Males had a median income of $22,250 versus $13,125 for females. The per capita income for the town was $8,577.  About 25.0% of families and 25.4% of the population were below the poverty line, including 20.0% of those under the age of eighteen and 56.8% of those 65 or over.

Education
Jericho is in the Marion School District. Its comprehensive high school is Marion High School.

References

External links
Encyclopedia of Arkansas History & Culture entry
Crittenden County website

Towns in Crittenden County, Arkansas
Towns in Arkansas
Memphis metropolitan area